The 1987–88 Missouri Tigers men's basketball team represented the University of Missouri as a member of the Big Eight Conference during the 1987–88 NCAA men's basketball season. Led by head coach Norm Stewart, the Tigers finished fourth in the Big Eight Conference, lost in the semifinal round of the Big Eight tournament, and received a bid to the NCAA tournament as the No. 6 seed in the East region. The Tigers were upset by Rhode Island, 87–80, in the opening round and finished with an overall record of 19–11 (7–7 Big Eight).

Roster

Schedule and results

 
|-
!colspan=9 style=| Regular Season

|-
!colspan=9 style=| Big Eight Conference tournament

|-
!colspan=9 style=| NCAA Tournament

Rankings

1988 NBA draft

References

Missouri
Missouri
Missouri Tigers men's basketball seasons